In Jainism, a Tirthankara (English: literally a 'ford-maker') is a saviour and spiritual teacher of the dharma (righteous path). The word tirthankara signifies the founder of a tirtha, which is a fordable passage across the sea of interminable births and deaths, the saṃsāra. According to Jains, Tirthankars are the supreme preachers of Dharma, who have conquered the saṃsāra, the cycle of death and rebirth, on their own, and made a path for others to follow. After understanding the true nature of the self or soul, the Tīrthaṅkara attains Kevala Gyana (omniscience).  Tirthankara provides a bridge for others to follow the new teacher from saṃsāra to moksha (liberation).

In Jain cosmology, the wheel of time is divided in two halves, Utsarpiṇī or ascending time cycle and avasarpiṇī, the descending time cycle (said to be current now). In each half of the cosmic time cycle, exactly twenty-four tirthankaras grace this part of the universe. There have been an infinite number of tirthankaras in the past time periods. The first tirthankara in this present time cycle (Hunda Avsarpini) was Rishabhanatha, who is credited for formulating and organising humans to live in a society harmoniously. The 24th and last tirthankara of the present half-cycle was Mahavira Swami Ji (599 BC–527 BC). History records the existence of Mahavira and his predecessor, Parshvanath, the twenty-third tirthankara.

A tirthankara organises the sangha, a fourfold order of male and female monastics, srāvakas (male followers) and śrāvikās (female followers).

The tirthankara's teachings form the basis for the Jain canons. The inner knowledge of tirthankara is believed to be perfect and identical in every respect and their teachings do not contradict one another. The degree of elaboration varies according to the spiritual advancement and purity of the society during their period of leadership. The higher the spiritual advancement and purity of mind of the society, the lower the elaboration required.

While tirthankaras are documented and revered by Jains, their grace is said to be available to all living beings, regardless of religious orientation.

Tīrthaṅkaras are arihants who after attaining kevalajñāna (pure infinite knowledge) preach the true dharma. An Arihant is also called Jina (victor), that is one who has conquered inner enemies such as anger, attachment, pride and greed. They dwell exclusively within the realm of their Soul, and are entirely free of kashayas, inner passions, and personal desires. As a result of this, unlimited siddhis, or spiritual powers, are readily available to them – which they use exclusively for the spiritual elevation of living beings. Through darśana, divine vision, and deshna, divine speech, they help others in attaining kevalajñana, and moksha (final liberation) to anyone seeking it sincerely.

Meaning
The word tirthankara signifies the founder of a tirtha which means a fordable passage across the sea of interminable births and deaths (called saṃsāra).
Tirthankaras are variously called "Teaching Gods", "Ford-Makers", "Crossing Makers" and "Makers of the River-Crossing.

Tīrthaṅkara-naam-karma 

Jain texts propound that a special type of karma, the tīrthaṅkara nama-karma, raises a soul to the supreme status of a Tīrthaṅkara. Tattvartha Sutra, a major Jain text, lists sixteen observances which lead to the bandha (bondage) of this karma:
Purity of right faith
Reverence
Observance of vows and supplementary vows without transgressions
Ceaseless pursuit of knowledge
Perpetual fear of the cycle of existence
Giving gifts (charity)
Practising austerities according to one's capacity
Removal of obstacles that threaten the equanimity of ascetics
Serving the meritorious by warding off evil or suffering
Devotion to omniscient lords, chief preceptors, preceptors, and the scriptures
Practice of the six essential daily duties
Propagation of the teachings of the omniscient
Fervent affection for one's brethren following the same path.

Panch Kalyanaka 
Five auspicious events called Pañca kalyāṇaka mark the life of every tirthankara:
 Gārbha kalyāṇaka (conception): When ātman (soul) of a tirthankara comes into his mother's womb.
 Janma kalyāṇaka (birth): Birth of a tirthankara. Indra performs a ceremonial bath on tirthankara on Mount Meru.
 Tapa kalyāṇaka (renunciation): When a tirthankara renounces all worldly possessions and become an ascetic.
 Jñāna kalyāṇaka: The event when a tirthankara attains kevalajñāna (infinite knowledge). A samavasarana (divine preaching hall) is erected from where he delivers sermons and restores sangha after that.
 Nirvāṇa kalyāṇaka (liberation): When a tirthankara leaves his mortal body, it is known as nirvana. It is followed by the final liberation, moksha, after which his souls dwells in Siddhashila.

Samavasarana

After attaining kevalajñāna, a tirthankara preaches the path to liberation in the samavasarana. According to Jain texts, the heavenly pavilion is erected by devas (heavenly beings) where devas, humans and animals assemble to hear the tirthankara. A tirthankara's speech is heard by all humans and animals in their own language. It is believed that during this speech, there is no unhappiness for miles around the site.

Tīrthaṅkaras of present cosmic age 
Jainism postulates that time has no beginning or end. It moves like the wheel of a cart. The wheel of time is divided in two halves, Utsarpiṇī (ascending half cycle) and Avasarpiṇī (descending half cycle). 24 tirthankaras are born in each half of this cycle. In Jain tradition the tirthankaras were royal in their final lives, and Jain texts record details of their previous lives. Their clan and families are also among those recorded in legendary stories. Jain canons state that Rishabhanatha, the first tirthankara, founded the Ikshvaku dynasty, from which 21 other tirthankaras also rose over time. Two tirthankaras – Munisuvrata, the 20th, and Neminatha, the 22nd – belonged to the Harivamsa dynasty.

In Jain tradition, the 20 tirthankaras attained moksha on mount Shikharji, in the present Indian state of Jharkhand. Rishabhanatha attained nirvana on Mount Ashtāpada (Mount Kailash), Neminatha on mount Girnar, Gujarat, and Mahavira, the last tirthankara, at Pawapuri, near modern Patna. Twenty-one of the tirthankaras are said to have attained moksha in the kayotsarga (standing meditation posture), while Rishabhanatha, Neminatha and Mahavira are said to have attained moksha in the Padmasana (lotus position).

List

Present cosmic age 

In chronological order, the names, emblems and colours of the 24 tirthankaras of this age are mentioned below:

Next cosmic age 

The 24 tirthankaras of the present age (avasarpinī) are the ones listed above. The names of the next 24, which will be born in utsarpinī age are as follows.

Iconography 

A tīrthaṅkara is represented either seated in lotus position (Padmasana) or standing in the meditation Khadgasana (Kayotsarga) posture. This latter, which is similar to the military standing at attention is a difficult posture to hold for a long period, and is preferred by Jains because it reduces to the minimum the amount of the body in contact with the earth, and so posing a risk to the sentient creatures living in or on it.  If seated, they are usually depicted seated with their legs crossed in front, the toes of one foot resting close upon the knee of the other, and the right hand lying over the left in the lap.

Tirthankara images do not have distinctive facial features, clothing or (mostly) hair-styles, and are differentiated on the basis of the symbol or emblem (Lanchhana) belonging to each tirthanakar except Parshvanatha.  Statues of Parshvanath have a snake crown on the head. The first Tirthankara Rishabha can be identified by the locks of hair falling on his shoulders. Sometimes Suparshvanath is shown with a small snake-hood. The symbols are marked in the centre or in the corner of the pedestal of the statue. The sects of Jainism Digambara and Svetambara have different depictions of idols. Digambara images are naked without any ornamentation, whereas Svetambara ones are clothed and decorated with temporary ornaments. The images are often marked with Srivatsa on the chest and Tilaka on the forehead. Srivatsa is one of the ashtamangala (auspicious symbols), which sometimes resembles fleur-de-lis, an endless knot, a flower or diamond-shaped symbol.

The bodies of tirthankara statues are exceptionally consistent throughout the over 2,000 years of the historical record. The bodies are rather slight, with very wide shoulders and a narrow waist.  Even more than is usual in Indian sculpture, the depiction takes relatively little interest in the accurate depiction of the underlying musculature and bones, but is interested in the modelling of the outer surfaces as broad swelling forms.  The ears are extremely elongated,  alluding to the heavy earrings the figures wore in their early lives before they took the path to enlightenment, when most were wealthy, if not royal.

Sculptures with four tirthanakars, or their heads, facing in four directions, are not uncommon in early sculpture, but unlike the comparable Hindu images, these represent four different tirthanakars, not four aspects of the same deity.  Multiple extra arms are avoided in tirthanakar images, though their attendants or guardians may have them.

In other religions 

The first Tirthankara, Rishabhanatha is mentioned in Hindu texts like the Rigveda, Vishnupurana and Bhagwata Purana. The Yajurveda mentions the name of three Tīrthaṅkaras – Ṛiṣhabha, Ajitnātha and Ariṣṭanemi. The Bhāgavata Purāṇa includes legends about the Tirthankaras of Jainism particularly Rishabha. 
Yoga Vasishta, Chapter 15 of Vairagya Khanda, Sloka 8 gives the saying of Rama:

Champat Rai Jain, a 20th-century Jain writer, claimed that the "Four and Twenty Elders" mentioned in the Book of Revelation (the final book of the Christian Bible) are "Twenty-four Tirthankaras".

See also 

 God in Jainism
 Kundakunda
 List of Tirthankaras
 Tattva (Jainism)

References

Citations

Sources 

 
 
 
 
 
 
 
 
 
 

 
 
 
 
 
 

 
 
 
 
 
 

 
God in Jainism
Jainism